Aguluzigbo is a Town in Anaocha Local Government of Anambra State, Nigeria. It comprises six villages: Iruowelle, Etuleze, Ihulu, Ufa, Ifite and Nduana. It is bordered by seven towns and they are Agulu, Ora-eri, Akwaeze, Igbo-ukwu, Nanka, Obeledu and Umuona. There are various pointers to the origin of the name. One version has it that the name "Aguluzigbo" is a shortened way of saying "Agulu nke di na uzo e si eje Igbo-ukwu" which translated in English would mean "The Agulu which is along the route to Igbo-ukwu". Apparently, the description serves to distinguish it from its neighbouring town which also goes by the name "Agulu".

Description
The town has a modern post office, Hospital and medical centre. The "Oyemma" serves as the town's centre. It is lined with shopping malls, restaurants, salons and barber shops.

The new yam festival, organised yearly, has attracted dignitaries and tourists from within and outside Nigeria. The town is renowned for its peaceful nature, cultured people, well maintained road networks and good town planning.

Aguluzigbo is one of the few town's whose history has been researched and documented. The book The History of Aguluzigbo was written by an indigene of Aguluzigbo.

Notable indigenes include

1. Chief Sir Senator Victor Umeh, OFR, OHAMADIKE

2. Chief Barrister JPC Anaeto

3. Chief Ernest Anyaeche, OCHENDO

4. Chief Arinze Anyaora, IDE

5. Sir Joe Dimobi

6. Rtd Navy Commodore BC Adogu

7. Professor Achalu, Okammuta

8 Chief Innocent Ejikeme

9. Rev Fr Anyaora

10. Sir Ewenike Celestine

Populated places in Anambra State